The European Handball Federation EHF is the governing body for Handball in Europe. It organises Three main Active club competitions : the EHF Champions League (formerly European Cup), the EHF Cup, and the EHF Challenge Cup. there is also another Two former EHF club competitions such as the EHF Cup Winners' Cup Existed between the years 1976 to 2013 and there is the EHF Men's Champions Trophy begin in 1979 and end it in 2008.
Spanish side FC Barcelona have won a record total of 22 titles in EHF Europe club competitions, Nine more than VfL Gummersbach.

The German clubs have won the most titles (62), ahead of clubs from Spain (48) .

Winners

By club

The following table lists all the men's clubs that have won at least one EHF Europe club competition, and is updated as of June 19, 2022 (in chronological order).

Key

By country
The following table lists all the countries whose clubs have won at least one EHF competition, and is updated as of June 19, 2022 (in chronological order).

Key

See also
European Handball Federation

References

External links
EHF Official Webpage

 

+
Handball-related lists